The Festival is a 2018 British comedy film directed by Iain Morris and co-written by Keith Akushie and Joe Parham. The film stars Joe Thomas, Hannah Tointon, Emma Rigby, Hammed Animashaun and Claudia O'Doherty.

Plot
Nick Taylor's girlfriend, Caitlin, breaks up with him before graduation, and he humiliates himself at the ceremony by begging her to take him back.

Nick’s friend Shane Simpson persuades him to come to the Giant Music Festival to get over her, as they have already bought their tickets and Shane wants to meet DJ Hammerhead (who performs wearing a hammerhead shark mask). On the train they meet Amy, a talkative, yet exuberant and jocund Australian who has attended the festival for nine consecutive years. Shane is clearly attracted to her. Despite hiding from the conductor by pretending to have an orgy in the toilet, the three are ejected from the train for traveling on child tickets.

After reaching the event on foot, Nick and Shane meet Caitlin and her wealthy and arrogant friends, who are staying in a luxurious tent. They meet a man nicknamed “Pirate” because of his amputated leg, who has designs on Caitlin, and puts Nick down by affecting to mistake his name for "Lick". Caitlin loses her phone; Nick finds it, despite being urinated on by another man, and brings it back to the tent. He has to hide when Caitlin and Pirate come in and start having sex, but is discovered; Shane and Nick are ousted and told to camp elsewhere.

Next morning Shane and Nick find that they have camped next to Amy. They spend a day with her, before meeting Caitlin and her friends again. Nick is humiliated by being knocked into the mud by a man who mistakes him for Harry Potter, and storms off back to his tent. Shane and Amy stumble upon a druid wedding in the woods. The groom, Brother David, reveals that he is Hammerhead’s manager and gives them backstage passes; he is then "bound to" his new bride, which turns out to be a male goat, with which he has prolonged sex in public. Meanwhile, Nick meets a girl dressed as a smurf. She gives him half a pill of ecstasy (MDMA), and they enjoy a drug-fueled night, culminating in ecstatic sex in a stranger's car.

Nick wakes to find her gone, but that he now has a nipple ring. Nick, Shane and Amy try to find Smurf Girl. They search piercing parlours, only to find that Nick also now has “My Name’s Not Lick” tattooed on his buttock, and that he left a prosthetic leg behind. When Nick goes to apologize to Pirate, he finds that he and Smurf Girl trashed Caitlin's friends' luxury tent, and that it is somebody else's prosthetic leg, Nick and Shane find a Hen Party of women dressed as smurfs, who promise them Smurf Girl's phone number if they perform a strip tease. The boys are arrested and their wristbands are confiscated so they cannot return to the event. They quarrel, as Shane will now miss Hammerhead’s performance.

Shane's stepfather Robin collects them and drives them home. At a petrol station, Nick finds his redemption and steals his car and drives them back to the festival. While climbing back in over a fence, Nick injures his nipple by catching his piercing on a wire. They reunite with Amy. Pirate, who is working security, tries to stop them from getting backstage but David intervenes. Shane and Amy meet Hammerhead and Amy gives him one of her homemade ‘Chafney’ bars. Nick finds Smurf Girl in the VIP bar, but she has little memory of him and no interest in seeing him again.

Hammerhead has an allergic reaction to the shell fish in the snack and, after trying and failing to inject him with an EpiPen, Shane goes on in his place, with his mask on. Pirate tries to remove him; he and Nick fight on stage and the Hammerhead mask is knocked off Shane’s head. Nick throws Pirate’s artificial leg into the crowd, with the help of Amy and she forgives Nick for ostracizing her, throughout the film. Shane plays music he has written himself, which the crowd loves. Shane and Amy kiss on live camera. They try to jump into the audience, miscalculate the distance and fall to the ground, but are later seen crowd-surfing away from the stage.

The three return home by train. Shane and Amy are now a couple, and Nick sits next to a beautiful girl dressed as an elf – only again to hide from the conductor due to purchasing children's tickets again.

Cast
 Joe Thomas as Nick Taylor
 Hammed Animashaun as Shane Simpson
 Claudia O'Doherty as Amy
 Hannah Tointon as Caitlin
 Kurt Yaeger as Pirate
 Jemaine Clement as Robin
 Noel Fielding as Hammerhead
 Lizzy Connolly as Lucy
 Chris Geere as Brother David
 Nick Frost as Ricky the Tattooist
 Emma Rigby as Smurf Girl
 Theo Barklem-Biggs as Gordy Symonds
 Leigh Williams as Clive The Newsagent
 Hugh Coles as Rex
 Jason Williamson as Police Officer

Production
Parts of the film were filmed at Leeds festival with actual festival goers being used as extras in the large crowd scenes. Filming also took place in fields near to the village of Compton Martin in Somerset.

Reception

References

External links
 

2018 films
2018 comedy films
British comedy films
Films shot in Yorkshire
2010s English-language films
2010s British films